Volleyball at the 1968 Summer Olympics was represented by two events: men's team and women's team. The Olympic Committee initially dropped volleyball for the 1968 Olympics, meeting protests.

Medal table

Medal summary

References

External links
Official Olympic Report

 
1968 Summer Olympics events
O
1968
International volleyball competitions hosted by Mexico